Slimnic may refer to the following places in Romania:

 Slimnic, a commune in Sibiu County
 Slimnic, a village in the commune Tâmboești, Vrancea County
 Slimnic (Coțatcu), a tributary of the Coțatcu in Vrancea County 
 Slimnic (Vișa), a tributary of the Vișa in Sibiu County